Kunja (Kánchá), also known as Lower Morehead or Peremka, is a Papuan language of New Guinea.

References

Tonda languages
Languages of Western Province (Papua New Guinea)